Maxacteon flammeus is a species of small sea snail, a marine opisthobranch gastropod mollusk in the family Acteonidae, the barrel bubble snails.

Description
The length of the shell attains  15mm, its width 9mm

The thick shell is ovate and inflated. Its ground color is white, covered with transverse striae and longitudinal waving reddish lines, often divided into three portions in their length. The conoid spire is canaliculated, composed of six whorls, the upper ones very approximate, the lowest much larger than all the others. The oblong aperture is widened, dilated at its base. The outer lip is very thin, almost sharp. The oblique columella, is slightly twisted. The operculum is thin.

The headshield is developing secondary tentacles.

Distribution
This species occurs in the Red Sea, in the Indian Ocean off Madagascar, Mauritius and the Mascarene  Basin; in the tropical West Pacific; also off  Tonga, New Zealand.and Australia (Western Australia).

References

 Powell A W B, William Collins Publishers Ltd, Auckland 1979 
 Wells, F.E. & Bryce, C.W. 1993. Sea Slugs of Western Australia. Perth : Western Australian Museum 184 pp.

External links
 Spencer H.G., Willan R.C., Marshall B.A. & Murray T.J. (2011). Checklist of the Recent Mollusca Recorded from the New Zealand Exclusive Economic Zone
 

Acteonidae
Gastropods of New Zealand
Gastropods described in 1789